Children of Mata Hari (also known as Pill of Death and The Deathmakers) is a 1970 international co-production crime film directed by Jean Delannoy and starring Klaus Kinski.

Cast

 Stéphane Audran as Dominique
 Klaus Kinski as Pavel Richko / Torpédo I
 Lilli Palmer as Helen
 Michel Constantin as Coster
 Angelo Infanti as Jean / Gianni
 Jean Claudio as La Filature
 Frédéric de Pasquale as Nicolas Baslier
 Noëlle Adam as L'amie de Dominique
 Philippe March as Le vendeur (as Aimé de March)
 Christine Fabréga as Sylvianne Collet
 Jacques Harden as L'inspecteur de Police de Paris
 Micheline Luccioni as L'employée des postes
 Georges Lycan as Torpédo II
 Philippine Pascal
 Bernard Musson as L'inspecteur de Police de Fécamp
 Roger Lumont as Le chauffeur routier
 Robert Favart
 Catherine Jacobsen as La 'boîte aux lettres'
 Henri Gilabert
 Pierre Koulak as Un inspecteur
 Alexandre Klimenko
 Michel Charrel as Un inspecteur
 Gérard Dauzat
 Paul Bisciglia
 Rita Maiden as La prostituée
 Driss Kettani
 Aldo Bastoni

References

External links

1970 films
1970s spy thriller films
1970s crime thriller films
French spy thriller films
French crime thriller films
1970s French-language films
Films directed by Jean Delannoy
Cold War spy films
Films based on French novels
Films scored by François de Roubaix
1970s French films